Rao Weihui (Pinyin: Ráo Wěihuī; born 25 March 1989) is a Chinese footballer who currently plays for Chinese Super League club Changchun Yatai.

Club career
Rao Weihui started his football career in 2008 with Chinese Super League club Shaanxi Chanba after he graduated from the club's youth team. He made his debut for the club on 9 April 2008 in a 0-0 away draw with Shenzhen Shangqingyin and was described by then manager Cheng Yaodong as an exciting prospect for the future. Despite the strong support from the manager, the club would struggle during the 2009 season with ultimately led to Cheng leaving the club, which left Rao with very little playing time throughout the season. However, in the following season, new manager Zhu Guanghu decided to move Rao from a midfield position into the defense where he quickly established himself as the team's starting fullback. Before the 2012 season, Rao stayed with Shaanxi as the club decided to move to Guizhou and rename themselves Guizhou Renhe.

In the 2019 Chinese Super League season Rao would suffer from a fibula fracture injury and it saw him miss much of the season while he saw his team get relegated at the end of the campaign. Having spent his whole career with the same club he was allowed to transfer to second tier club Changchun Yatai who he officially joined on 31 August 2020. On 12 September 2020 he would make his debut in the first league game for the club of the season that ended in a 2-1 victory against Heilongjiang Lava Spring. Rao would go on to establish himself as a vital member of the team and at the end of the 2020 league campaign he would go on to win the division title with the club.

International career
Rao made his debut for the Chinese national team on 18 November 2014 in a 0-0 draw against Honduras.

Career statistics
Statistics accurate as of match played 31 December 2020.

Honours

Club
Guizhou Renhe
 Chinese FA Cup: 2013
 Chinese FA Super Cup: 2014
Changchun Yatai
 China League One: 2020

References

External links
 
 
 Career stats at csldata.

1989 births
Living people
People from Xingning
Hakka sportspeople
Footballers from Meizhou
Chinese footballers
Beijing Renhe F.C. players
Changchun Yatai F.C. players
Chinese Super League players
China League One players
China international footballers
Association football defenders